New Iceland is the name of a region on Lake Winnipeg in the Canadian province of Manitoba which was named for settlers from Iceland. It was settled in 1875.

Background 
In 1875, over 200 Icelanders immigrated to Manitoba establishing the New Iceland colony along the west shore of Lake Winnipeg in Manitoba, the first part of a large wave of immigrants who settled on the Canadian prairies.
The more general migration followed an offer from Lord Dufferin of land in Manitoba to establish what amounted to a "free state".

Due to harsh environmental and economic conditions in Iceland, including the eruption of Mount Askja, some 20,000 Icelanders left their homeland between 1870 and 1915—roughly a quarter of the population of Iceland. In 1875 a large group of Icelandic immigrants migrated from Ontario to Manitoba, leaving Kinmount, Ontario, on 25 September 1875, for Gimli, Manitoba, on the shores of Lake Winnipeg. One of the main reasons for the choice of the colony site was "the abundance of fish" in Lake Winnipeg, but according to The Icelandic People in Manitoba, their first attempts at fishing on Lake Winnipeg were not successful, partly because they set their nets too close to the shore. Moreover, the "winter of 1875–1876 was one of the coldest on record in Manitoba, and the settlers' clothes, including the leather shoes from Ontario, were not suitable for the rigorous weather". However, the immigrants eventually learned to handle the ax, prepare the soil, fish through ice, and hunt game. They also learned how to drain the land, grow crops, and build better houses.

These Icelandic settlers, known in their native language as Vestur-Íslendingar (meaning Icelanders in the West; initially many Icelanders did not see emigration as a change of country, and there was some discussion of moving the entire population), called their settlement "New Iceland", and the region remains a symbolic centre of the Icelandic heritage in Canada today.

Other information 
According to Statistics Canada (government agency), Manitoba is home to the largest Icelandic population outside of Iceland. There are about 26,000 people with Icelandic ancestry living in Manitoba, making up about 2 per cent of the total population of the province. About 35 per cent of the Icelandic Canadian population lives in Manitoba.
Currently many ethnic festivals related to New Iceland, such as Íslendingadagurinn, are held in these areas, and also the weekly newspaper Lögberg-Heimskringla is printed in Winnipeg.
The University of Manitoba has an Icelandic department in which students can study Icelandic language and literature at the undergraduate and graduate levels.
Gimli, Manitoba, was within the "Icelandic Reserve" granted to Icelandic settlers by the Government of Canada in 1875.  Contrary to popular misconception, New Iceland was never a "republic", though the settlers did organize their own local government, which until December 1881 was outside the boundaries of Manitoba.  The reserve, at that time within the District of Keewatin, Northwest Territory, was always under Canadian jurisdiction, and the Icelanders were keenly aware of their new loyalties and obligations as Canadians and British subjects—as evidenced during speeches made at Gimli during the visit of Lord Dufferin, Governor General of Canada, in 1877.

See also 
 Council of Keewatin
 Demographics of Manitoba
 David Arnason
 Einar Hjörleifsson Kvaran
 Jón Bjarnason (minister)
 Sigtryggur Jonasson
 Leif Erikson
 Lake Manitoba
 Fraserwood
 Interlake
 Rural Municipality of Gimli

References

Bibliography 
 Guðjón Angrímsson (1997), Nýja Ísland: Saga of the journey to New Iceland 
 David Arnason (1994), The new Icelanders: A North American community 
 Kristin Olafson-Jenkyns (2001), The Culinary Saga of New Iceland: Recipes from the Shores of Lake Winnipeg

External links 
 Manitoba Historical Society - Icelandic Settlement
New Iceland Heritage Museum
Lögberg-Heimskringla
Icelandic Festival (Íslendingadagurinn)
University of Manitoba Canada-Iceland Conference
Facts about Icelandic Canadians

Icelandic-Canadian culture in Manitoba
Places in Canada settled by Icelanders
 
Geography of Manitoba
History of Manitoba by location
19th century in Iceland
Populated places established in 1875
1875 establishments in Canada